Diocese of Nampula may refer to:

 Roman Catholic Archdiocese of Nampula
 Diocese of Nampula, Anglican Church of Mozambique and Angola